When Voiha Wakes is a novel by Joy Chant published in 1983. It is the third book in the House of Kendreth series, following Red Moon and Black Mountain (1970), and The Grey Mane of Morning (1977).

Plot summary
When Voiha Wakes is a novel in which women rule and men are uneducated.

Reception
Dave Langford reviewed When Voiha Wakes for White Dwarf #50, and stated that "Arrange the sexes as you will: it stays a relatively mundane story. Caused me no pain.". In 2009, Brian Stableford described the novel as "more enterprising, but less successful" than The Grey Mane of Morning "in its depiction of a matriarchal society".

Reviews
Review by Faren Miller (1983) in Locus, #271 August 1983 
Review by Judy Collins (1983) in Fantasy Newsletter, #63 October–November 1983 
Review by Baird Searles (1984) in Isaac Asimov's Science Fiction Magazine, January 1984 
Review [French] by Élisabeth Vonarburg (1984) in Solaris, #54 
Review by Don D'Ammassa (1984) in Science Fiction Chronicle, January 1984 
Review by Mary Gentle (1984) in Interzone, #8 Summer 1984

References

1983 novels